Beatriz Dizotti (born 13 April 2000) is a Brazilian swimmer. She represented Brazil at the 2020 Summer Olympics which also marked her debut appearance at the Olympics. She competed in the women's 1500 metre freestyle event during the 2020 Summer Olympics, which was the first Olympic Games where women were allowed to compete in the 1500 metre freestyle.

At the 2022 World Aquatics Championships, in Budapest, Hungary, in the Women's 1500 metre freestyle event, she finished sixth with a time of 16:05.25, a new Brazilian record, and the best position ever obtained by a Brazilian in the event.

On 29 October 2022, Dizotti won the silver medal in the short course 1500 metre freestyle at the 2022 FINA Swimming World Cup in Toronto, Canada, finishing in a Brazilian record and personal best time of 15:48.82. One day earlier, she placed tenth in the 400 metre freestyle with a 4:13.89 and ninth in the 200 metre butterfly with a 2:17.11, both in approximately one hour. The following month, on 30 November, she placed fourth in the 800 metre freestyle at the 2022 U.S. Open Swimming Championships, held in Greensboro, United States, with a time of 8:40.10. The next day she finished third in a time of 4:18.24 in the b-final of the 400 metre freestyle. On the fourth and final day, she won the silver medal in the 1500 metre freestyle with a time of 16:18.40.

References

External links
 

2000 births
Living people
Brazilian female butterfly swimmers
Brazilian female freestyle swimmers
Place of birth missing (living people)
Swimmers at the 2020 Summer Olympics
Olympic swimmers of Brazil
Sportspeople from São Paulo
Competitors at the 2018 South American Games
South American Games medalists in swimming
South American Games gold medalists for Brazil
South American Games bronze medalists for Brazil
21st-century Brazilian women